This is a List of clubs in the Verbandsliga Württemberg, including all clubs and their final placings from the inaugural 1978–79 season to the current one. The league is the highest football league in the Württemberg region of Baden-Württemberg. It is one of 35 leagues at the sixth tier of the German football league system. Until the introduction of the 3. Liga in 2008 it was the fifth tier of the league system, until the introduction of the Regionalliga in 1994 the fourth tier.

Overview
The league was formed in 1978 to replace the two regional amateur leagues that existed in its place until then, the Amateurliga Nordwürttemberg and the Amateurliga Schwarzwald-Bodensee, as the third tier in Baden-Württemberg. At the same time, the Amateur-Oberliga Baden-Württemberg was formed above it.

League timeline
The league went through the following timeline of name changes, format and position in the league system:

League placings
The complete list of clubs in the league and their league placings.

1978–1994
The complete list of clubs and placings in the league while operating as a tier four league from 1978 to 1994:

1994–present
The complete list of clubs and placings in the league while operating as the tier five (1994–2008) and six (2008–present) league:

Key

 S = No of seasons in league (as of 2022–23)

Notes
 1 In 1995 GSV Maichingen withdrew their team from the Oberliga.
 2 In 2001 SSV Ulm 1846 withdrew from the 2nd Bundesliga to the Verbandsliga for financial reasons.
 3 In 2007 the football department of SB Heidenheim left the club to form 1. FC Heidenheim 1846. 
 4 In 2011 VfL Kirchheim/Teck voluntarily withdrew from the league.
 5 In 2003 VfR Heilbronn merged with SpVgg Heilbronn to form FC Heilbronn.
 6 In 2010 TSV Crailsheim withdrew their team from the Oberliga.
 7 In 2008 TSV Schwieberdingen withdrew their team from the Oberliga.
 8 In 2014 1. FC Heidenheim II withdrew their team from the Oberliga.
 9 In 2017 Stuttgarter Kickers withdrew their reserve team from the Oberliga.

References

External links 
  Das deutsche Fußball-Archiv Historic German league tables
  WFV: Verbandsliga and Landesliga

Football competitions in Baden-Württemberg
Wurttemberg